Riverside South is a proposed skyscraper development in Canary Wharf, London. Some below ground-level work was completed by 2014 on behalf of investment bank J.P. Morgan & Co., which bought a 999-year lease on the site with the intention of making the building its London office, but the firm has now moved into an existing Canary Wharf building. Future plans for  Riverside South have not been publicised.

Planning
The development is being planned by J.P. Morgan & Co., which purchased a 999-year lease on the site from Canary Wharf Group in November 2008. It will be located on the western side of the Isle of Dogs, immediately south of Westferry Circus on the edge of the River Thames. This is one of the few sites left in the Docklands area which has been identified as suitable for the construction of skyscrapers.

These were approved in the summer of 2004.

The application confirmed work was underway on site. The new design was granted planning permission by the London Borough of Tower Hamlets on 21 June 2007.

The taller tower could become the tallest building in Canary Wharf, exceeding One Canada Square by a metre (on an AGL basis; One Canada Square is higher AOD, so will still appear taller on the skyline). The combined development will have the longest river frontage of any building in London, and in terms of floorspace will be among the largest offices in Europe.

Construction

In early 2007, JPMorgan considered the development as an option for their new London premises, which would involve relocating from their various City of London offices. The company initially decided to remain in the City, but in August 2008, the company announced that it had signed heads of terms to move to Riverside South, and in November 2008 JP Morgan signed an agreement to purchase a 999-year lease on the site for £237 million.

Canary Wharf Contractors Limited were contracted to construct the basement structure up to ground level. Work on the basement slab for Tower 1 began in July 2009, with concrete being poured for the basements. Two crane bases appeared on site in September 2009, but work ceased in 2010. In December 2010, JP Morgan said that it would be moving its London staff into 25 Bank Street, a smaller building on the Canary Wharf estate that was once the London office of the collapsed investment bank Lehman Brothers. In April 2011, JP Morgan announced their intention to complete the building up to street level with work due to start in October 2011. , work on the basement levels is complete but it is unclear if JP Morgan intend to commence with full construction.

See also
 Canary Wharf
 Isle of Dogs

References

External links 

 Riverside South on Skyscrapernews.com

Buildings and structures in the London Borough of Tower Hamlets
Canary Wharf buildings
Redevelopment projects in London
Skyscrapers in the London Borough of Tower Hamlets
Richard Rogers buildings